Qiú is the Hanyu Pinyin transliteration of 仇 (Qiú) and 裘 (Qiú).

仇 (Qiú)
There are three sources for the ancestry of 仇:
A Xia vassal by the name of Jiuwu (九吾) established the state of Jiu (九), but it was destroyed by King Zhou of Shang in the Shang Dynasty. To escape prosecution, the descendants of Jiuwu appended the 人 ("person") radical to 九 (Jiu), thus creating the surname 仇.
In the Spring and Autumn period, Duke Min of Song (宋湣公) was murdered by his subordinate Nangong Wan (南宮萬). The minister Zi Qiumu (子仇牧) sought revenge but was also killed by Nangong Wan. Zi Qiumu's descendants then took the first character of his name, Qiu 仇, to be their surname.
In Northern Wei, a Hou Luoqi (侯洛齊) of Zhongshan was adopted by the Qiu clan, and thus changed his surname from Hou to Qiu. He rose in ranks due to his military endeavours, and the Qiu clan became prosperous at the time.
 
Prominent people with the surname
 Qiu Ying (仇英), Chinese painter
 Qiu Zhaobie (仇兆鳌) - Ming-Qing Scholar
 Qiu Qiongying (仇瓊英)
 Qiu He (仇和)

裘 (Qiú)
Prominent people with the surname
 Qiu Xigui (裘锡圭), Chinese historian, palaeographer
 Qiu Xiaolong (裘小龙), Chinese-American author

See also
 Chinese name
 Qiū (surname) (丘, 邱 and 秋)
 Khoo - the surname Qiu, pronounced in Fujian dialect
 Chiu - romanized version of Qiu
 Khuu - In Vietnam, this surname is written in Quoc Ngu

Multiple Chinese surnames

References

Surnames
Chinese-language surnames